is a 2004 Japanese film directed by Kiyoshi Sasabe. It was chosen as Best Film at the Japan Academy Prize ceremony.

Summary
Respected inspector Soichiro Kaji is imprisoned for killing his wife, Keiko, who, suffering from Alzheimer's disease, requested it. His colleagues at Tokyo Police Force discover that Kaji intended to commit suicide after killing her, but instead went away on a bullet train two days later. A suspicious item is found in his coat pocket that suggests Kaji was unfaithful. The incident makes headlines in Tokyo, where a young female reporter sets out to find the truth about the acclaimed yet intriguingly silent defendant. Soichiro Kaji has drawn the interest of many: lawyer, judge, detective, relative... Slowly they weave the tale behind it all and tentatively tread upon the question of euthanasia.

Cast
 Akira Terao: Soichiro Kaji
 Mieko Harada: Keiko Kaji
 Hidetaka Yoshioka
 Mayu Tsuruta
 Kyohei Shibata
 Kirin Kiki: Yasuko Shimamura
 Reiko Takashima
 Jun Kunimura
 Tsuyoshi Ihara
 Tomoko Naraoka

Reception
The film was nominated for twelve awards at the 2005 Japan Academy Prize, winning Best Film and Best Actor. It also won the award for Best Actor at the 2005 Blue Ribbon Awards.

References

External links
 
 
 
 
 
 

2004 films
Films directed by Kiyoshi Sasabe
2000s Japanese-language films
Toei Company films
Picture of the Year Japan Academy Prize winners
2000s Japanese films